Rise Above Records is a London-based independent record label owned by Lee Dorrian (of the band Cathedral and formerly of Napalm Death).

Founding
Lee Dorrian started Rise Above Records in 1988 without the intention of the label being an ongoing position. It was during the same year that he had left his previous band, Napalm Death. Dorrian explained that it was predominantly done to "get the dole off my back as they were asking a lot of questions as Napalm Death were on the front cover of the NME and on TV three times in one week, but I was still living in a council flat and couldn't even afford the rent."

Rise Above Records was initially started up on the Enterprise Allowance Scheme, a Conservative government initiative which fronted cash to young entrepreneurs.

Style
Dorrian's initial intention was to release hardcore punk music and limited edition releases. The label was named after the Black Flag song of the same name. The first release from the label was a Napalm Death live EP (Extended play) followed by releases from bands such as S.O.B. and Long Cold Stare.

Dorrian was a fan of bands such as Candlemass, Saint Vitus and Trouble but stated there "wasn't really a 'doom scene' as such" and that "doom became an obsession" for him. Finding that there were a scattered amount of doom metal groups in the United States (specifically Maryland), Dorrian attempted to "give the scene a boost" and released a compilation titled Dark Passages, a compilation stating that "if people asked what doom was you could point to that record and there was something tangible to grab hold of." Dorrian found that the release "didn't get as many bands as we'd have liked, hence the reason why there are two Cathedral tracks on there." Dorrian admitted later that it took until 1997 "that a new wave of doom bands started to appear. Ever since then it's become really strong." Dorrian specifically noted Electric Wizard's Come My Fanatics... as being "the turning point of everything."

Artists

Current artists 

 Angel Witch
 Antisect
 Age Of Taurus
 ASTRA
 Beastmaker
 Blood Ceremony
 Church of Misery
 Death Penalty
 Diagonal
 Gentlemans Pistols
 Galley Beggar
 Hidden Masters
 Horisont
 Saturn
 Septic Tank
 Twin Temple
 Uncle Acid & the Deadbeats
 Witchsorrow
 Workshed

Former artists 
 Bang
 Bottom
 Capricorns
 Cathedral
 Chrome Hoof
 Circulus
 Comus
 Debris Inc.
 Electric Wizard
 Firebird
 Goatsnake
 Ghost
 The Gates of Slumber
 Grand Magus
 Hangnail
 Incredible Hog
 The Iron Maiden
 The Last Drop
 Leaf Hound
 Long Cold Stare
 Lucifer
 Mourn
 Moss
 Napalm Death
 Naevus
 The Oath
 Orange Goblin
 Pentagram
 Penance
 Pod People
 Purson
 Revelation
 Sally
 Sea of Green
 Serpentcult
 Shallow
 sHEAVY
 Sleep
 S.O.B.
 Sunn O)))
 Taint
 Teeth of Lions Rule the Divine
 Unearthly Trance
 Witchcraft

Discography

Main releases
 RISE 001 - Napalm Death Live - 7-inch EP (vinyl only)
 RISE 002 - S.O.B. Thrash Night - 7-inch EP (vinyl only)
 RISE 003 - Long Cold Stare - Tired Eyes LP (vinyl only)
 RISE 004 - S.O.B. - What's the Truth LP/MC/CD
 RISE 005 - Various Artists - Dark Passages LP/MC/CD
 RISE 006 - Revelation - Salvations Answer LP/MC/CD
 RISE 007 - Penance - The Road Less Travelled LP/MC/CD
 RISE 008 - Cathedral - In Memorium CD/Maxi EP (Ltd only purple vinyl)
 RISE 009 - Electric Wizard - Electric Wizard CD/LP (Ltd only green vinyl)
 RISE 010 - Mourn - Mourn CD
 RISE 011 - Electric Wizard/Our Haunted Kingdom split 7-inch 
 RISE 012 - Various Artists - Dark Passages II - CD 
 CDRISE 13 - Various Artists - Magick Rock vol. 1 CD
 CDRISE 14 - Electric Wizard - Come My Fanatics... CD
 CDRISE 15 - Orange Goblin - Frequencies from Planet Ten CD
 CDRISE 16 - Naevus - Sun Meditation CD
 CDRISE 17 - sHEAVY - The Electric Sleep CD
 CDRISE 18 - Orange Goblin - Time Travelling Blues CD
 CDRISE 19 - Sleep - Jerusalem CD
 CDRISE 20 - Electric Wizard - Come My Fanatics.../Electric Wizard 2×CD
 CDRISE 21 - Cathedral - In Memoriam CD
 CDRISE 22 - Goatsnake - Goatsnake Vol. 1 CD
 CDRISE 23 - Hangnail - Ten Days Before Summer CD
 CDRISE 24 - Sally - Sally CD
 CDRISE 25 - Orange Goblin - The Big Black CD/LP
 CDRISE 26 - sHEAVY - Celestial Hi-Fi CD
 CDRISE 27 - Electric Wizard - Dopethrone CD
 CDRISE 28 - Shallow - 16 Sunsets in 24 Hours CD
 CDRISE 29 - Sunn O))) ØØ Void CD
 CDRISE 30 - Goatsnake - Flower of Disease CD
 CDRISE 31 - Firebird - Firebird CD
 RISECD 32 - Hangnail - Clouds in the Head CD
 RISECD 33 - Sea of Green - Time to Fly CD
 RISECD 34 - Grand Magus - Grand Magus CD
 RISECD 35 - The Last Drop - Where Were You Living One Year from Now? CD
 RISECD/LP 36 - Electric Wizard - Let Us Prey CD/LP
 RISECD 37 - Orange Goblin - Coup de Grace (CD)
 RISECD 38 - Orange Goblin - Time Travelling Blues/Frequencies From Planet Ten 2×CD
 RISECD 39 - sHEAVY - Synchronized CD
 RISECD 40 - sHEAVY - The Electric Sleep/Blue Sky Mind 2×CD
 RISECD 41 - Teeth of Lions Rule the Divine - Rampton CD
 RISECD 42 - Bottom - Feels So Good When You're Gone CD
 RISECD 43 - Sally - C-Earth CD
 RISECD/LP 44 - Grand Magus - Monument Cd/LP (blue vinyl, gatefold sleeve)
 RISECD/LP 45 - Unearthly Trance - Season of Séance, Science of Silence CD/2LP (500 copies, black vinyl, deluxe gatefold)
 RISECD/LP 46 - Orange Goblin - Thieving from the House of God Cd/LP (1000 copies, orange vinyl, deluxe gatefold)
 RISECD/LP 47 - Witchcraft - Witchcraft CD/LP w/bonus track/PicDisc
 RISECD/LP 48 - Electric Wizard - We Live Cd/2LP (1000 copies, purple vinyl)
 RISECD 49 - Pod People - Doom Saloon CD
 RISECD 50 - ???
 RISE7 51 - Orange Goblin - Some You Win, Some You Lose 7-inch
 RISECD/LP 52 - Electric Wizard - Dopethrone re-issue CD/2LP (1000 white vinyl, 500 black vinyl. 2nd press: 50 Purple Silk, 100 Transparent Amber, 100 clear, 550 black)
 RISECD 53 - Orange Goblin - The Big Black re-issue CD
 RISEMCD/MLP 54 - Capricorns - Capricorns CD/LP
 RISECD/LP 55 - Unearthly Trance - In the Red CD/LP (blood red vinyl)
 RISEMLP 56 - Thy Grief Eternal - On Blackened Wings 12-inch (500 black vinyl, 500 silver/grey vinyl)
 RISEMLP 57 - Eternal - Lucifer's Children 12-inch (500 clear vinyl, 500 black vinyl)
 RISECD 58 - sHEAVY - Republic? CD
 RISECD 59 - Debris Inc. - Debris Inc. CD
 RISECD/LP 60 - Grand Magus - Wolf's Return CD/LP (500 black vinyl, 500 silver/grey vinyl)
 RISECD 61 - ???
 RISECD/LP 62 - Witchcraft - Firewood CD/LP (deluxe gatefold, 500 gold vinyl, 500 black vinyl)
 RISECD/LP 63 - Circulus - The Lick on the Tip of an Envelope Yet to Be Sent CD/LP (1000 black vinyl, 500 swirly vinyl, 100 clear vinyl)
 RISE7 64 - Circulus/Witchcraft split 7-inch (500 copies)
 RISE7/MCD 65 - Circulus - Swallow Cd single/7" (bright green and yellow)
 RISECD/LP 66 - Taint - The Ruin of Nova Roma CD/2LP
 RISECD 67 - Capricorns - Ruder Forms Survive CD
 RISE7 68 - Leaf Hound - "Freelance Fiend" 7-inch
 RISECD 69 - Grand Magus - Grand Magus (2006 re-issue w/ bonus tracks) CD
 RISECD 70 - Electric Wizard - Pre-Electric Wizard 1989-1994 CD
 RISECD/LP 71 - Electric Wizard - Electric Wizard (re-master) digiCD/LP w/bonus 7-inch (500 black vinyl, 500 ice blue vinyl, 500 luminous lime green vinyl)
 RISECD/LP 72 - Electric Wizard - Come My Fanatics... (re-master) digiCD/2LP w/bonus 7-inch (400 violet sparkle vinyl, 100 violet sparkle w/colored 7-inch, 500 deep red vinyl, 500 black vinyl)
 RISECD 73 - Electric Wizard - Dopethrone (re-master) digiCD
 RISECD 74 - Electric Wizard - Let Us Prey (re-master) digiCD/2×LP (100 clear vinyl, 500 deep red vinyl, 500 black vinyl)
 RISECD 75 - Electric Wizard - We Live (re-master) digiCD
 RISECD 76 - Orange Goblin - Frequencies From Planet Ten. Reissued in 2011 with three bonus tracks.
 RISECD 77 - Orange Goblin - Time Travelling Blues. Reissued in early 2011 with three bonus tracks.
 RISECD 78 - Orange Goblin - The Big Black
 RISECD 79 - Orange Goblin - Coup De Grace. Reissued in 2011 with three bonus tracks.
 RISECD 80 - Orange Goblin - Thieving From The House Of God
 RISECD/LP 81 - Firebird - Hot Wings
 RISECD/LP 82 -  Mourn - Mourn CD/LP (100 clear vinyl, 200 leaf green vinyl, 400 black vinyl)
 RISECD 83 - Litmus - Planetfall CD
 RISE7 84 - Burning Saviours - "The Giant" 7-inch (100 clear vinyl 400 black vinyl)
 RISECD 85 - ???
 RISE7 86 - Gentlemans Pistols - "The Lady" 7-inch (100 clear vinyl, 400 black vinyl)
 RISE7 87 - Witchcraft - "If Crimson Was Your Colour" 7-inch (225 black vinyl, 225 clear vinyl)
 RISEMCD/MLP 88 - Winters - High As Satellites CD/LP (black vinyl, blue vinyl)
 RISECD 89 - Teeth of Lions Rule the Divine - Rampton deluxe edition 
 RISECD 90 - ???
 RISECD 91 - ???
 RISEMCD/MLP 92 - Chrome Hoof - Beyond Zade
 RISECD/LP 93 - Circulus - Clocks Are Like People digiCD/LP (500 white vinyl w/ bonus 7-inch, 700 blue vinyl, 500 black vinyl)
 RISE7/CD 94 - Circulus - Song of Our Despair CD single/7" (black vinyl, clear vinyl, violet vinyl)
 RISE7 95 - Moss/Monarch - split 7-inch (50 sea blue vinyl, 100 clear vinyl 400 black vinyl)
 RISECD 96 - Winters - Black Clouds in Twin Galaxies CD
 RISECD 97 - ???
 RISECD/LP 98 - Gentlemans Pistols - Gentlemans Pistols CD/LP (100 clear vinyl, 200 yellow vinyl, 200 black vinyl)
 RISELP 99 - Miasma & The Carousel of Headless Horses - Perils
 RISECD/LP 100 - Electric Wizard - Witchcult Today CD/LP (100 purple vinyl, 200 black sparkle vinyl, 200 green vinyl)
 RISE7 101 - Diagonal - Heavy Language 7-inch (500 black sparkle vinyl)
 RISECD 102 - Never released (According to Jeremy at Rise Above)
 RISECD/LP 103 - Witchcraft - The Alchemist CD/LP (25 ultra blue vinyl, 50 clear vinyl, 500 magnolia vinyl, 400 black sparkle vinyl, 500 black vinyl)
 RISECD/LP 104 - Taint - Secrets and Lies CD
 RISE10 107 - Atavist - Alchemic Resurrection 10-inch
 RISELP 108 - Moss - Sub Templum 2LP
 RISECD/LP 109 - Blood Ceremony - Blood Ceremony CD/LP (300 red/black vinyl w/bonus 7-inch, 300 purple vinyl, 300 black vinyl)
 RISECD/LP 112 - Serpentcult - Weight of Light CD/LP (300 silver/grey vinyl w/bonus 7-inch, 300 white/black splatter vinyl, 300 black vinyl)
 RISECD/LP 113 - Grand Magus - Iron Will CD/LP (200 clear vinyl, 200 white vinyl, 300 black vinyl)
 RISE7 114 - Crowning Glory/Gates of Slumber split 7-inch (black vinyl, green vinyl, blue vinyl)
 RISECD 115 - Capricorns - River Bear Your Bones CD
 RISE12/116 - Electric Wizard/Reverend Bizarre - split 12-inch EP (350 blood red vinyl w/poster, 500 purple vinyl, 500 clear vinyl, 500 silver vinyl, 500 black vinyl)
 RISECD 124 - Ghost - Opus Eponymous
 RISECD 130 - Electric Wizard- Black Masses CD

In early 2011 the label also reissued five Orange Goblin albums with bonus tracks largely covers or demo versions of preceding tracks, released with the same catalogue numbers as when they were first released.

Rise Above Relics releases
 RAR7 001 - Luv Machine - "Witches Wand" 7-inch
 RARCD/LP 001 - Luv Machine - Turns You On! CD/LP (500 black vinyl, 400 cerise vinyl, 100 clear vinyl)
 RARCD/LP 002 - Possessed - Exploration CD/LP
 RARCD/LP 004 - AX - "You've Been So Bad"
 RARCD/LP 005 - Necromandus - "Orexis of Death & Live"
 RARLP       006 - Comus - "First Utterance"
 RARLP       007 - Mellow Candle - "Swaddling Songs PLUS" Deluxe Boxset
 RARCD/LP 008 - Steel Mill - "Jewels of the Forest"
 RARCD/LP 009 - Incredible Hog - "Volume 1 + 4"
 RARCDBOX010 - Bang - "Bullets 4 x CD Box Set"
 RARCD/LP 011 - The (Original) Iron Maiden - "Maiden Voyage" CD/LP (Bonus vinyl single with LP by BUM) + extensive booklet
 RARCD/LP 013 - Rog & Pip - "Our Revolution"

See also 
 List of record labels
 List of independent UK record labels

Notes

References

External links 
 Official site

 
Doom metal record labels
British independent record labels